Kleppen is a surname. Notable people with the surname include:

Halvor Kleppen (born 1947), Norwegian media personality, theme park owner, and writer
Hans Kleppen (1907–2009), Norwegian ski jumper

See also
 Kleppen, Norway
 Klepper